Patricia Daničić (born ) is a retired Croatian female volleyball player. She was part of the Croatia women's national volleyball team.

She competed with the national team at the 2000 Summer Olympics in Sydney, Australia, finishing 7th.

See also
 Croatia at the 2000 Summer Olympics

References

External links
profile at sports-reference.com
https://web.archive.org/web/20170303200847/http://www.cev.lu/Competition-Area/MatchPage.aspx?mID=15841&ID=366
http://www.todor66.com/volleyball/Olympics/Women_2000.html
https://www.faz.net/aktuell/sport/volleyball-bundesliga-schwerins-frauen-vor-dem-titel-hattrick-138024.html

1978 births
Living people
Croatian women's volleyball players
Sportspeople from Rijeka
Volleyball players at the 2000 Summer Olympics
Olympic volleyball players of Croatia